Qingshan Dam is a concrete gravity forebay dam on the Dajia River in Heping District, Taichung, Taiwan. The dam is the second in a cascade of hydroelectric power plants along the Dajia River, and is located directly below the Techi Dam and upstream of the Kukuan Dam.

The dam supplies water to a power station with a capacity of 360 megawatts (MW) from four 90 MW turbines, generating 591 million kilowatt hours annually. It is the largest of the hydroelectric plants along the Dajia River.

See also

 List of power stations in Taiwan
 List of dams and reservoirs in Taiwan
 Electricity sector in Taiwan

References

1970 establishments in Taiwan
Dams completed in 1970
Dams in Taichung
Gravity dams
Hydroelectric power stations in Taiwan